The University of Bath is a public research university located in Bath, Somerset, United Kingdom. It received its royal charter in 1966, along with a number of other institutions following the Robbins Report. Like the University of Bristol and University of the West of England, Bath can trace its roots to the Merchant Venturers' Technical College, established in Bristol as a school in 1595 by the Society of Merchant Venturers. The university's main campus is located on Claverton Down, a site overlooking the UNESCO World Heritage city of Bath, and was purpose-built, constructed from 1964 in the modernist style of the time.

In the 2021 Research Excellence Framework, 40% of Bath's submitted research activity achieved the highest possible classification of 4*, defined as world-leading in terms of originality, significance and rigour. 92% was graded 4*/3*, defined as world-leading/internationally excellent. The annual income of the institution for 2021–22 was £361.8 million of which £40.5 million was from research grants and contracts, with an expenditure of £388.3 million.

The university is a member of the Association of Commonwealth Universities, the Association of MBAs, the European Quality Improvement System, the European University Association, Universities UK and GW4.

History 

The University of Bath can trace its roots to the Merchant Venturers' Technical College (whose alumni include the physicists Paul Dirac and Peter Higgs), an institution founded as a school in 1595 and a technical school established in Bristol in 1856 which became part of the Society of Merchant Venturers in 1885. Meanwhile, in the neighbouring city of Bath, a pharmaceutical school, the Bath School of Pharmacy, was founded in 1907. This became part of the Technical College in 1929.

The college came under the control of the Bristol Education Authority in 1949; it was renamed then the Bristol College of Technology, and in 1960 the Bristol College of Science and Technology, when it became one of ten technical colleges under the umbrella of the Ministry of Education. The college was mainly housed in the former Muller's Orphanage at Ashley Down in Bristol, which still houses part of the City of Bristol College whilst the remainder has been converted into residential housing.

University status
In 1963, the Robbins Committee report paved the way for the college (along with a number of other institutions) to assume university status as Bath University of Technology.

Although the grounds of Kings Weston House, in Bristol, were briefly considered — which then, and until 1969, accommodated the college's School of Architecture and Building Engineering — the City of Bristol was unable to offer the expanding college an appropriately sized single site. Following discussions between the College Principal and the Director of Education in Bath, an agreement was reached to provide the college with a new home in Claverton Down, Bath, on a greenfield site, purchased through a compulsory purchase order from the Candy family of Norwood Farm, overlooking the city.

Construction of the purpose-built campus began in 1964, with the first building, now known as 4 South, completed in 1965, and the royal charter was granted on 25 October 1966. In November 1966, the first degree ceremony took place at the Assembly Rooms in Bath.  Over the subsequent decade, new buildings were added as the campus took shape.

In the mid-19th century, there were plans to build a college on the site.

The university logo features the so-called Gorgon's head which is taken, via the university's coat of arms, from a Roman sculpture found in the city. The university pays a peppercorn a year to the city for rent of a  parcel of land.

Until 30 October 2012, it was also a member of the 1994 Group.

A report by the Higher Education Funding Council for England into governance at the university was published on 20 November 2017.

Controversies

In November 2017, frustration with the governance of the university grew, especially concerning the Vice Chancellor, Glynis Breakwell's remuneration. The HEFCE carried out an enquiry and recommended 13 changes to the governance of the university. In November 2017, Breakwell's salary rose by 3.9% (£17,589) to over £468,000 and she was reported as the highest paid Vice Chancellor in the country.
The university and College Union had an "emergency meeting" of all staff to discuss the issue and the students' union organised a vote of no confidence involving all undergraduate and postgraduate students.

By August 2017, four MPs had resigned from the advisory board at the University of Bath in protest against the vice-chancellor's pay package. In November 2017 Breakwell agreed to retire, taking a sabbatical on full pay from September 2018 until retirement in February 2019 when a £31,000 car loan to her would be written off. In January 2018 the University Court voted for her immediate departure and demanding the chair the governing council and remuneration committee should step down, though this decision could not override the existing contractual agreement with Breakwell.

On 5 March 2018, at 13:30, a group of 10 Bath students supporting the UCU strike action occupied the vice chancellor's suite in protest of the university's support for UUK's proposed pension reforms. The occupation was endorsed by Bath MP Wera Hobhouse. The university was criticised for its initial response to the protesters, blocking the entrance to the only freely accessible toilets in the occupied area for the first 21 hours of the occupation. The university's response was criticised by local councillor Joe Rayment, alumnus Marcus Sedgwick, NUS Black Students' officer, and prompted the resignation of an external examiner.

In September 2018, it was announced that Ian H. White would take over from Glynis Breakwell as Vice-Chancellor in April 2019.

Campus and facilities

Main campus
The university's main campus is located on Claverton Down, approximately 1.5 miles from the centre of Bath. The site is compact; it is possible to walk from one end to the other in fifteen minutes. The design involved the separation of vehicular and pedestrian traffic, with road traffic on the ground floors and pedestrians on a raised central thoroughfare, known as the Parade. Buildings would line the parade and student residences built on tower blocks rise from the central thoroughfare. Such plans were mostly followed.

At the centre of the campus is the Library, a facility open round the clock offering computing services, information and research assistance as well as books and journals. A number of outlets are housed around the parade, including restaurants, bars and fast-food cafés, plus two banks, a union shop and two small supermarkets, as well as academic blocks. Building names are based on their location and distance vis-à-vis the library (e.g. 1 East, 2 East). Odd-numbered buildings are on the same side of the parade as the Library, and even-numbered buildings are on the opposite side.

Buildings along the east–west axis are mostly directly accessible from the parade, which is generally considered to be "level two", but later additions, such as 7 West, 9 West, 3 West North and 8 East, follow the rule less strictly. 7 West is generally accessible only via 5 West or 9 West, and 3 West North, 9 West and 8 East have entrances at ground level at varying distances from the main parade. Buildings on the south of the campus, 1 South to 4 South, are accessible via roads and pedestrian walkways by the university lake and gardens.

Buildings, as in many of the so-called plate glass universities, were constructed in a functional modernist style using concrete, although such designs were later derided for lacking the charm of the Victorian red-brick universities or the ancient and medieval ones. In Bath, there is a particular contrast between the concrete campus and the Georgian style architecture of the World Heritage City of Bath.

The eastern part of the campus is dominated by the Sports Training Village, built in 1992 and enhanced in 2003 with an extension.

The northern perimeter of the university is bounded by student residences Brendon Court, Eastwood, Marlborough Court, Solsbury Court, Norwood House, Osborne House, Polden Court, The Quads, Westwood, and Woodland Court. The original plan for students to be housed in tower blocks above the parade continues with the small number of rooms (110) in Norwood House. However, the second tower block, Wessex House, now hosts offices rather than residences.

The university also owns buildings in the city of Bath, mostly student accommodation dotted around town, including Canal Wharf, Carpenter House, Clevelands Building, John Wood Building and John Wood Court, Pulteney Court and Thornbank Gardens.

There is also an Innovation Centre that provides work space, practical support and expertise to local technology enterprises and entrepreneurial companies that emerge from the university's student and academic research base

Two new buildings were opened in 2017. The Virgil Building, adapted from a former police station, offers a hub and support for students and staff in the centre of Bath, including professional, counselling and careers services, Joblink, a skills centre and learning commons. The university also opened a centre at 83 Pall Mall in central London, with a stated aim of building partnerships and engaging with business, politics and Bath's alumni community in the UK's capital.

Over several years, the grounds have received recognition for their outstanding beauty with awards from Bath in Bloom.

Campus developments
The university continually upgrades its Claverton Down campus with new teaching blocks. A proposal to move the boundary of the green belt away to the edge of the campus to facilitate further development was agreed in October 2007 by the local council following a public inquiry, although the boundary of the Cotswolds Area of Outstanding Natural Beauty still crosses the site. In July 2005, building 3 West North (officially opened on 27 October) was completed. The deconstruction of the asbestos-contaminated 4 West was completed in mid-2005 and the 4 West building opened in April 2010, providing additional teaching and office space.

Completed projects

4 West, complete with Cafe, completed March 2010
A new Student Centre, completed October 2010
The East Building, a multifunction building (offices and teaching rooms), completed May 2011
The Chancellors' Building, new teaching facilities, completed October 2013
The Quads is a new student accommodation building on campus with 703 en-suite bedrooms, completed summer 2014
The Edge opened in early 2015 and has teaching facilities, theatre, gallery, performance and rehearsal studios
 1 West refurbishment to add new learning and research facilities and computer laboratories and offices
 4 East South, a new building providing research and teaching space for the Faculty of Engineering & Design as well as a cutting edge computing data centre. Opened June 2016
 10 West, a multifunction building which will allow the expansion of the Department of Psychology, a new home for the Institute of Policy Research as well as providing dedicated postgraduate study space. Formally opened on 20 July 2016 by Professor Dame Vicky Bruce.
 The Virgil Building, a £4.5million investment to transform the former police station on Manvers Street into a learning zone with office space for student-facing services including study space, training rooms and a coffee bar. Office Space is also provided for the Careers Service, Student Services and others for advice and guidance.
 The Milner Centre for Evolution, a £7 million development dedicated to evolution research. The centre formally opened in September 2018.
Polden Corner, to provide 300 postgraduate bed spaces on the Western edge of campus close to existing campus accommodation.

University of Bath in Swindon
The university opened a second site, Oakfield Campus, in 2000 on Marlowe Road Swindon, on a site leased from the council. Formerly Oakfield School, the site was jointly funded by the university and Swindon Council. Officially The University of Bath in Swindon, the campus offered undergraduate courses in childhood studies and social work.
The campus was closed in the summer of 2008.

Under the Gateway Project, the university had planned to build a major new campus next to the Great Western Hospital and the Coate Water nature reserve. The project had met opposition from environmentalists and locals but had met with Government approval. The university withdrew from the project in March 2007 citing "prevailing planning and funding conditions".

Organisation
The university is divided into four faculties and each faculty into various departments.

Faculty of Engineering & Design
Architecture and Civil Engineering
Chemical Engineering
Electronic & Electrical Engineering
Mechanical Engineering

Faculty of Humanities & Social Sciences
Economics
Education
Health
Politics, Languages & International Studies
Psychology
Social & Policy Sciences

Faculty of Management
School of Management

Faculty of Science
Biology & Biochemistry
Chemistry
Computer Science
Mathematical Sciences
Natural Sciences
Pharmacy & Pharmacology
Physics

Academic profile
The university's major academic strengths have been engineering, the physical sciences, mathematics and technology. Today, the university is also strong in management, humanities, architecture and the social sciences. Courses place a strong emphasis on vocational education; the university recommends students to take a one-year industry placement in the penultimate year of the course, although there is no formal recognition of these placements on students' final degree certificates.

According to the latest government assessments, Bath has 15 subjects rated "excellent", the highest on the scale. These are: Pharmacy and Pharmacology; Business and Management (AMBA accredited); Architecture and Civil Engineering; Economics; Computer Science; Electronic and Electrical engineering; Mechanical Engineering (IMechE accredited); Mathematics, Statistics and Operational research; Education; Molecular Biosciences; Biosciences; Physics and Astronomy; Politics; Sport; Social Policy and Administration.

Research
Bath was ranked joint 25th amongst multi-faculty institutions in the UK for the quality (GPA) of its research and 28th for its Research Power (the grade point average score of a university, multiplied by the full-time equivalent number of researchers submitted) in the 2021 Research Excellence Framework. Bath was ranked joint 12th in the UK amongst multi-faculty institutions for the quality (GPA) of its research and 33rd for its Research Power in the 2014 Research Excellence Framework. Over half of the submissions were ranked in the top 10 nationally in their Units of Assessment. 6 out of 13 submissions were ranked in the top 20.

Bath has been awarded the Queen's Anniversary Prize twice. In 2011, the university received the award for the Department of Social & Policy Sciences' 'Influential research into child poverty and support for vulnerable people'. The university also received the prize in 2000 to recognise the 'invaluable services to industrial and scientific communities' of the Centre for Power Transmission & Motion Control.

Rankings and reputation

National
The University of Bath received a Gold award as part of the UK Government's Teaching Excellence Framework (TEF). The framework evaluates universities on criteria including teaching quality, learning environment and student outcomes, taking into account factors such as student satisfaction, retention rates and employment.

Bath is ranked 11th in the Complete University Guide 2018 League table and has 18 subjects placed within the top 10 in the UK. Architecture and Marketing are ranked number one. The university is ranked 5th in The Guardian University Guide 2018. Bath is ranked 12th of 128 universities across the UK in the Good University Guide.

In The Sunday Times 10-year (1998–2007) average ranking of British universities based on consistent league table performance, Bath was ranked 12th overall in the UK. Bath was one of only eight universities (along with the G5, St Andrews and Warwick) to have never left the top 15 in one of the three main domestic rankings between 2008 and 2017. Bath has been named as the ‘University of the Year’ by The Sunday Times Good University Guide 2023.

According to data released by the Department for Education in 2018, Bath was rated as the 7th best university in the UK for boosting male graduate earnings with male graduates seeing a 22.2% increase in earnings compared to the average graduate, and the 8th best university for females, with female graduates seeing a 15.2% increase in earnings compared to the average graduate. Bath was ranked 13th out of 122 UK institutions in the 2017 Times Higher Education (THE) Student Experience Survey. Bath students were joint most likely to recommend the university to their friends.

International 
In the QS World University Rankings 2018 Bath is ranked 160 out of 959 institutions.

The university is ranked 167th out of 750 major institutions in the 2017 Leiden Ranking.

Admissions

In the 2020/21 academic year 19,041 students studied at the university, of whom 13,589 were undergraduates and 5,452 were postgraduates. Around 32% of students are international students (those with non-British domicile), representing 147 nationalities with the largest number coming from China (including Hong Kong), France, India and Malaysia.

27.4% of Bath's undergraduates are privately educated, the eleventh highest proportion amongst mainstream British universities. In the 2016–17 academic year, the university had a domicile breakdown of 71:10:19 of UK:EU:non-EU students respectively with a female to male ratio of 47:53.

Applications outside the EU to the university for undergraduate courses dropped 18.5% at a time early in the recruitment cycle that these applications to competing universities grew by 11.5% for the 2018/19 academic year.

Student life

Sports and TeamBath

Students' Union

The University of Bath Students' Union (formerly BUSU) known as The SU University of Bath has been recognised by the NUS as one of the top three in the UK. The current SU president is Alexander Robinson. The SU runs over 100 clubs and societies including sports clubs, cultural, arts, interest and faith societies. Some notable examples are:

 Bath RAG collects money for local and national charities, raising over £1 million since 1966
 The Arts Societies (including student theatre, musicals, dance, and various musical groups) performs plays and other shows to audiences both on campus and in the town, with support provided by Backstage Technical Services.
 The Students' Union faith groups include Hindu, Buddhist, Christian, Islamic, Jewish societies as well as an Atheists, Humanists & Secularists society.
 Three student media outlets: a fortnightly student newspaper, Bath Time; a radio station, University Radio Bath; and a television station, Campus TV (CTV).

Notable alumni

Arts and media
Ash Atalla, TV producer
Tom Bewick, chief executive, Creative & Cultural Skills (2004-2010)
Rob Bell, TV presenter
Keith Christmas, English folk/rock musician
Paul Barbier, also known as Ian Cognito, comedian
Nigel Dick, pop music video producer
Rob Fisher keyboardist and songwriter with Naked Eyes and Climie Fisher
Neil Fox, radio DJ and TV presenter
Mike Graham, journalist and radio broadcaster for TalkSport
Gareth Gwynn, comedy writer and presenter for radio and TV
Sean Li, Hong Kong film actor
Chuck Pfarrer, American screenwriter, novelist, former US Navy SEAL
Katherine Roberts, author
Russell Senior, formerly of the band Pulp
Jonty Usborne, radio engineer

Politicians, lawyers, and civil servants
Sir Stephen Dalton, Chief of Air Staff, RAF
Don Foster, Liberal Democrat former MP for Bath
Sandra Gidley, Liberal Democrat former MP for Romsey
Mohamed Fahmy Hassan, Chairman of Maldives Civil Service Commission
Mansoor Hekmat, Iranian Communist Leader
Yang Jiechi, Foreign Minister of the People's Republic of China
Eric Joyce, Labour MP for Falkirk
T S Krishnamurthy, former Chief Election Commissioner of India
David Kurten, UKIP Member of the London Assembly
Edward Lowassa, former Prime Minister of the United Republic of Tanzania
Anne McClain, member of the 2013 NASA Astronaut Class
Mohammad Tufik Rahim, former Iraqi Minister of Industry and Mines
Julia Reid, UK Independence Party MEP
Tom Rivett-Carnac lobbyist for the United Nations Framework Convention on Climate Change
Karin Smyth, Labour MP for Bristol South
Falah Mustafa Bakir, Foreign Minister of Iraqi Kurdistan
Hassan Diab, former Prime Minister of Lebanon.
Tony Kerpel, retired Conservative politician and adviser.

Business people
Robert Fry, Executive Chairman of the McKinney Rogers Group, former Vice President of Hewlett-Packard, served as Commandant General Royal Marines
Tan Hooi Ling, co-founder and Chief Operating Officer of Grab Holdings Inc.
Sir Julian Horn-Smith, former COO of Vodafone
Justin King, former CEO of Sainsbury's
Kieran O'Neill, entrepreneur
Stewart Till, Chairman of United International Pictures and Millwall FC
Bob Wigley, former Chairman Merrill Lynch, Europe, Middle East and Africa; Chairman of Yell Group plc

Academics
Doug Altman, founder and Director of Centre for Statistics in Medicine and Cancer Research UK Medical Statistics Group
Nigel Healey, Vice Chancellor at Fiji National University
Elena Korosteleva, Director of the Institute for Global Sustainable Development at the University of Warwick
Florence Wambugu, African plant pathologist and virologist
Salleh Mohammad Yasin, Director of International Institute for Global Health at the United Nations University and Former Vice-Chancellor of the National University of Malaysia

Sports personalities

Sandy Abi Elias, Lebanon international footballer
Marcus Bateman, former British rower
Steve Borthwick, former Bath and England rugby union player
Luke Charteris, Wales international rugby union player
Pamela Cookey, a member of the England netball team that won bronze at the Melbourne 2006 Commonwealth Games
Rachel Dunn, international English netball player
Joe El-Abd, RC Toulonnais rugby union player
Morgan Evans, Gloucestershire All Golds rugby league player
Kelly Gallagher, alpine skier, won Britain's first ever Winter Paralympic gold medal during Sochi 2014 Paralympic Games
Sean Gelael, Indonesian racing driver who was a Formula One test driver between 2017 and 2018 for Scuderia Toro Rosso
Mark Hardinges, cricketer
Kate Howey, British judo player, represented Great Britain at four Olympiads; winning bronze at Barcelona in 1992 and silver in Sydney
James Hudson, London Irish and England Saxons rugby union player
Michael Jamieson, swimmer, won the silver medal in the 200-metre breaststroke at the London 2012 Summer Olympics
Katy Livingston, modern pentathlon, competed in Beijing Olympics and won individual bronze at the 2008 World Championships.
Richard Mantell, played for the GB hockey team at the Beijing Summer Olympics
Samantha Murray, modern pentathlete, won the silver medal at the London 2012 Summer Olympics
Marilyn Okoro, 400m and 800m runner who made her Olympic debut in Beijing
Craig Pickering, Olympic 100m sprinter, World Championship medalist and bobsleigher
Gareth Rees, Glamorgan CCC cricketer
Ben Rushgrove, T36 100m silver medal at the Beijing 2008 Paralympic Games
Jon Sleightholme, former English Rugby player
Heather Stanning, gold medal for British women's rowing at the London 2012 Summer Olympics
Matt Stevens, Bath, England and British and Irish Lions rugby union player
Sam Underhill, England international rugby player and Bath rugby.
Sam Weale, modern pentathlon, represented Great Britain at the Beijing 2008 Summer Olympics
Amy Williams, British skeleton gold medalist at the 2010 Winter Olympics
Lloyd Wallace, British freestyle skier, competed in the 2018 Winter Olympics in Pyeongchang, South Korea.

See also 

 Armorial of UK universities
 College of advanced technology (United Kingdom)
 List of universities in the United Kingdom
 University of Bath Department of Psychology
 University of Bath School of Management

Notes

References

External links

University of Bath Students' Union

 
Educational institutions established in 1966
1966 establishments in England
Universities established in the 1960s
Universities UK